Little Rocky is a mountain located in the Catskill Mountains of New York. It is part of a massif that includes Ashokan High Point, Mombaccus Mountain and South Mountain in West Shokan. Hanover Mountain is located north, Breath Hill is located northwest, and Big Rosy Bone Knob is located southwest of Little Rocky.

References

Mountains of Ulster County, New York
Mountains of New York (state)